The 1990 New Hampshire gubernatorial election took place on November 6, 1990. Incumbent Governor Judd Gregg won reelection to a second term that would be his last, as he ran for and won election to the United States Senate in 1992.

Election results

References

See also

New Hampshire
1990
Gubernatorial